The 2018 ADAC Zurich 24 Hours of Nürburgring was the 46th running of the 24 Hours of Nürburgring. It took place over 10–13 May 2018.

The #912 Manthey Racing team won the race in a Porsche 911 GT3 R.

Race results
Class winners in bold.

References

External links
 2018 24 Hours of Nürburgring official results

Nürburgring 24 Hours
2018 in German motorsport
May 2018 sports events in Germany